Alpheias is a genus of snout moths. It was described by Émile Louis Ragonot in 1891, and is known from Mexico, Jamaica, and the US states of California and Texas.

Species
 Alpheias baccalis Ragonot, 1891 
 Alpheias bipunctalis Hampson, 1919 
 Alpheias conspirata Heinrich, 1940 
 Alpheias gitonalis Ragonot, 1891 
 Alpheias oculiferalis (Ragonot, 1891) 
 Alpheias querula Dyar, 1913 
 Alpheias transferens Dyar, 1913 
 Alpheias vicarilis Dyar, 1913

References

Cacotherapiini
Pyralidae genera
Taxa named by Émile Louis Ragonot